The Lone Star Showdown is the traditional rivalry for all varsity men's and women's athletics competitions between Texas A&M University and the University of Texas at Austin. The name comes from Lone Star State, which is the nickname of the state of Texas. The "Lone Star Showdown" moniker was trademarked in 1996.

Being the two oldest public universities in the State of Texas, the two schools are rivals in most major sports (primarily football). Both universities boast large living alumni bases (over 665,000) and a significant following from supporters throughout the state and nation.

The football portion of the Lone Star Showdown ended in 2011 when Texas A&M moved to the Southeastern Conference. Texas and Texas A&M still compete regularly in other sports besides football in non-conference play.

The State Farm Lone Star Showdown started in 2004 and was created to bring more attention to the rivalry in non-major sports. The Lone Star Showdown trophy was awarded to the winning school each year based on head-to-head matchup in each sport. The final episode of the annual competition occurred during the 2011–12 academic year.

In August 2021, Texas announced it will join the SEC no later than the 2025-26 academic year.

Game results

Football

Baseball

Men's basketball

Women's basketball

Softball

Women's volleyball

Women's soccer

State Farm Lone Star Showdown

The State Farm Lone Star Showdown started in 2004 and was created to bring more attention to the rivalry in non-major sports. The Lone Star Showdown trophy was awarded to the winning school each year based on head-to-head matchup in each sport. The final episode of the annual competition occurred during the 2011–12 academic year.

Point system
Points were awarded for all sports in which both schools maintained an intercollegiate team. Each sport was worth one point, which was awarded to the winner of the head-to-head matchup between the two teams. Each team received ½ point for a head-to-head matchup that ended in a tie. In baseball, the team that won the regular season three-game series was awarded one point (and in the rare event of a split caused by each team winning one of the first two games, and the third game being called on account of weather with the game tied or not played, each team would receive ½ point). In sports where the teams met twice during the season — softball, volleyball, and men's and women’s basketball — each contest was worth ½ point.

If the universities did not compete in head-to-head regular season competition, the team that placed higher at the Big 12 Conference Championship would earn the point, and a tie in Big 12 Conference Championship competition would result in the point being split between the two schools. In the sport of track and field, multi-school meets were not counted as head-to-head competition.

There were a total of 19 possible points in each of the annual competitions, with 10 points needed to win. When the competition ended in a 9½ to 9½ tie, the rules provided that the winner of the previous year would retain the title for the following year.

Series history and standings
2004–05 Winner: Texas  —  Score: 14½ to 4½
2005–06 Winner: Texas  —  Score: 14 to 5
2006–07 Winner: Texas  —  Score: 10½ to 8½
2007–08 Winner: Texas A&M — Score: 10½ to 8½
2008–09 Winner: Texas A&M — Score: Tied 9½ to 9½ †
2009–10 Winner: Texas – Score: 10 to 9
2010–11 Winner: Texas  —  Score: Tied 9½ to 9½ †
2011–12 Winner: Texas  —  Score: 12 to 7

†Previous year's winner retains title in the event of a tie, as per the tie-breaker rule.

Overall results (2004–2012)
Total wins: Texas 6 (63%), Texas A&M 2 (37%)
Total points: Texas 90.5 (60%), Texas A&M 61.5 (40%)

State Farm Scholar-Athlete
Beginning with the 2006–07 school year, State Farm began honoring a member of the home team at each Showdown event as a State Farm Scholar-Athlete for their achievements both in competition and in the classroom.

2009–10 Honorees:
Jon Wiegand, Texas, Tennis
Loryn Johnson, Texas, Softball
Elze Potgieter, Texas A&M, Tennis
Michael Wacha, Texas A&M, Baseball
Kendal Carillo, Texas, Baseball
Kelsea Orsak, Texas A&M, Softball
Nathan Walkup, Texas A&M, Basketball
Damitria Buchanan, Texas A&M, Basketball
Casey Strange, Texas A&M, Swimming & Diving
Damion James, Texas, Basketball
Justin Mason, Texas, Basketball
Dexter Pittman, Texas, Basketball
Kristen Nash, Texas, Basketball
Ryan Tannehill, Texas A&M, Football
Adrienne Woods, Texas, Swimming & Diving
Rachel Shipley, Texas A&M, Soccer
Jennifer Banse, Texas A&M, Volleyball
Heather Kisner, Texas, Volleyball

2008–09 Honorees:
Keith Shinaberry, Texas, Baseball
Kyle Thebeau, Texas A&M, Baseball
Erin Tresselt, Texas, Softball
Conor Pollock, Texas A&M, Tennis
Bailey Schroeder, Texas A&M, Softball
Sarah Lancaster, Texas, Tennis
La Toya Micheaux, Texas A&M, Basketball
Josh Carter, Texas A&M, Basketball
Scott Drews, Texas, Swimming & Diving
Kathleen Nash, Texas, Basketball
Stephanie Logterman, Texas, Soccer
Mary Batis, Texas A&M, Volleyball
Lauren Paolini, Texas, Volleyball
Chris Ogbonnaya, Texas, Football
Sarah Woods, Texas A&M, Women's Swimming & Diving
Connor Atchley, Texas, Men's Basketball

2007–08 Honorees:
Jen Moore, Texas A&M, Volleyball
Elisabeth Jones, Texas A&M, Soccer
Michelle Moriarty, Texas, Volleyball
Stephen McGee, Texas A&M, Football
Joseph Jones, Texas A&M, Men's Basketball
Mary Yarrison, Texas, Women's Swimming & Diving
Alejandro Jacobo, Texas A&M, Men's Swimming & Diving
Morenike Atunrase, Texas A&M, Women's Basketball
Connor Atchley, Texas, Men's Basketball
Earnesia Williams, Texas, Women's Basketball
Erin Tresselt, Texas, Softball
Anna Blagodarova, Texas A&M, Women's Tennis

2006–07 Honorees:
Karen Haight, Texas, Soccer
Kristen Heiss, Texas A&M, Women's Swimming & Diving
Michelle Moriarty, Texas, Volleyball
Neale Tweedie, Texas, Football
Earnesia Williams, Texas, Women's Basketball
Tyler O'Halloran, Texas, Men's Swimming & Diving
Acie Law IV, Texas A&M, Men's Basketball
Katy Pounds, Texas A&M, Women's Basketball
Craig Winder, Texas, Men's Basketball
Kacie Gaskin, Texas, Softball
Conor Pollock, Texas A&M, Men's Tennis
Petra Dizdar, Texas, Women's Tennis
Amanda Scarborough, Texas A&M, Softball
Matt Ueckert, Texas A&M, Baseball
Bradley Suttle, Texas, Baseball

2020 Revival 
In August 2020, it was announced that the rivalry would be revived in the name of supporting Feeding America. The event was set to take place on September 4 and coincide with the Annual College Colors Day. For each purchase of officially licensed Texas A&M or Texas merchandise, Wells Fargo would donate 100 meals to Feeding America member food banks.

See also

 List of most-played college football series in NCAA Division I
 Texas–Texas A&M football rivalry

References

External links

College sports rivalries in the United States
Texas culture
Texas Longhorns
Texas A&M Aggies
College sports in Texas